imeni Vorovskogo is the name of several inhabited localities in Russia.

Urban localities
imeni Vorovskogo, Moscow Oblast, a work settlement in Noginsky District, Moscow Oblast

Rural localities
imeni Vorovskogo, Vladimir Oblast, a settlement in Sudogodsky District of Vladimir Oblast